Dinogetia was an ancient Geto-Dacian settlement and later Roman fortress located on the right (southern) bank of the Danube near the place where it joins the Siret.  The Dinogetia site is situated in Northern Dobruja 8 kilometres east of Galați, Romania and 2 kilometers north of Gărvan, a village in Jijila commune.

Roman and Byzantine period

The Geto-Dacian settlement was conquered by the Romans and transformed into a boundary fortress. The site was mentioned by Ptolemy. Located in the center of an arc made by the Danube around Macin, Galați and Gura Prutului, the Roman fortress of Dinogetia-Garvãn had initially been a castellum (a small fortress), thereby playing a role in the defensive system on the Lower Danube. Some other important Roman fortresses at the time were those from Barbosi (Galați County) and Troesmis (Tulcea County). Having been of great importance in Constantine the Great's time, the fortress was reinforced since the time of Diocletian. In Anastasius's and Justinian's time some structures were added to the stronghold. But by the end of the 2nd century AD, when the great barbarian invasions had begun, Dinogetia had grown in importance, especially after the abandonment by the Romans of the Dacian province. Its strategic position in the north-western corner of Dobrudja gave the fortress an important role in the defensive system of the province.

After a period of rebuilding during the Severan period, in the 3rd century Dinogetia was again a target for the barbarian invaders. After the abandonment of Dacia, the strategic importance of the site had increased. Aurelian, Probus and Diocletian initiated a policy of fortification of the entire Danubian lines, Dinogetia included. During the Late Antiquity Dinogetia had a key role in the defensive system of the Roman province. First Anastasius, then Justinian reinforced the fortress's walls. The attack of the Avars/Kutrigurs under Zabergan's command in 559 had disastrous consequences for the stronghold.

Archaeological research has uncovered ruins of a large house, a Roman bath, a church, a basilica and a graveyard outside the wall. These ruins have been heavily disrupted, though, because a feudal site had been built over the Roman one.

The Diocletian constructed wall (c. 3 m wide) has fourteen horseshoe-shaped towers.
Buildings  located on the Dinogetia Site:
praetorium
the ruins of a large house
4 c basilica
4 c ruins of a Roman bath
9 C church
Stamped Bricks

From the Later Roman Empire there are registered at Dinogetia bricks stamped with the mark of Legio I Iovia (Scythica) and the presence of Gothic federates as well. Also, the 4th century witnessed the building of "the house of the commander" (domus), as well as the baths, the latter perhaps having been built even earlier, according to the latest archaeological finds. Also, written sources, such as Notitia Dignitatum, certify some Milites Scythici (NDOr, XXXIX, 24), thus confirming the archaeological evidence. In the ecclesiastical sources there are registered Christian martyrs dated in the reign of Licinius, especially from the army, thus certifying the Christianization of the area. Other army units that were stationed at Dinogetia include: Legio V Macedonica, Cohors I Cilicum, Cohors II Mattiacorum, cl. fl. Moesica (2nd century), Legio I Iovia (4th century)

The fortress had been inhabited until the end of the 6th or the beginning of the 7th century when, in the context of Phokas's rebellion, the entire lines of Lower Danube had collapsed under the pressure of Slav tribes. In this context, Dinogetia also was abandoned as a military strongpoint. 
The fortress was rebuilt and became the siege of a Byzantine garrison after the successful campaigns of the emperor Ioannes Tzimiskes (969-976) against the Kievian Russians, when Dobruja was again incorporated to the Empire. The presence of Byzantine troops is certified until the 12th century, when Dinogetia was gradually deserted and finally abandoned perhaps in 1186.

Middle Age period

9th-century church findings:

Gold artefacts

Wall paintings traces

See also 
 List of castles in Romania
 Tourism in Romania

References and archeologists
STRATEG. Strategii defensive şi politici transfrontaliere. Integrarea spaţiului Dunării de Jos în civilizaţia romană 
Alexandru Barnea Article
Alexandru Barnea Article
Alexandru Barnea Article
Alexandru Barnea Article
Alexandru Barnea Article
Alexandru Barnea Article

Castles in Romania
Roman sites in Romania
Byzantine sites in Romania
Ruins in Romania
Former populated places in Eastern Europe
Dacian towns
Buildings and structures in Tulcea County
Tourist attractions in Tulcea County
Historic monuments in Tulcea County